TVRI Sulawesi Selatan (TVRI South Sulawesi, legally LPP TVRI Stasiun Sulawesi Selatan) is a regional public television station owned-and-operated by TVRI, serving whole province of South Sulawesi, Indonesia. The station's studios are located on Jalan Pajonga Daeng Ngalle 5, Mamajang, Makassar.

History 
TVRI Sulawesi Selatan first signed on the air on 7 December 1972 as TVRI Ujung Pandang, become one of the earliest local television stations in Indonesia and the first in Sulawesi region. LPP TVRI South Sulawesi was established based on the Decree of the Governor of South Sulawesi Number 178/VII/71 dated 15 July 1971 by assigning the Establishment Committee. While the Governor was Achmad Lamo, who was also the Chairman, involving the South Sulawesi regional leaders as advisors, and the Commander of the Regional Defence Command (Pangkowilham) IV as the patron, the Mayor of Ujung Pandang Municipality, H.M. Daeng Patompo, as the initiator, was appointed as the Chief Executive.

In the beginning, TVRI Ujung Pandang started its broadcast programme in the status of "trial broadcast". At that time, TVRI Ujung Pandang broadcasts could be seen for a radius of 60 kilometres in six areas: Ujung Pandang City, Maros, Pangkajene Islands, Gowa, Takalar and Jeneponto. The trial broadcast used a 1 KW VHF (Very High Frequency) transmitter with a tower height of 75 metres.

According to the central TVRI masterplan, TVRI Ujung Pandang was planned to be built in 1978, but with the initiative and insistence of local government elements, especially the Mayor of Ujung Pandang Municipality, HM Dg. Patompo succeeded in inviting the national company Gobel and its Japanese partner PT Matsushita Electric Company, to establish a TVRI station in Ujung Pandang.

On 2 November 2022, at morning (WITA), TVRI Sulawesi Selatan has stopped broadcasting analog television in Makassar first, and is only available through terrestrial digital television broadcasts on channel 28 UHF (multiplexing TVRI Makassar).

References

External links
 TVRI Sulawesi Selatan brief information on TVRI website
 TVRI Sulawesi Selatan Facebook page

Television stations in Indonesia
Television channels and stations established in 1972
1972 establishments in Indonesia
Mass media in Makassar
TVRI